Późniak or Przestrzał - is a Polish coat of arms.

Gallery

External links 
  Pozniak Coat of Arms (with correct heraldic badge) & bearers

See also
 Polish heraldry
 Heraldic family
 List of Polish nobility coats of arms

Bibliography
 Księga herbowa rodów polskich, Tom 1. str. 516-517, Tom 2. str. 309, Juliusz Karol Ostrowski, Warszawa 1897

Polish coats of arms